Tristan James Blewett (born 26 August 1996) was a South African professional rugby union player for the New Orleans Gold in Major League Rugby in the United States. His regular position is centre, but he can also play as a winger or fullback.

Early life and schoolboy rugby

Blewett was born in Johannesburg, but grew up in Pietermaritzburg in KwaZulu-Natal. He attended Hilton College, where he was included in various KwaZulu-Natal provincial teams. In 2012, he represented them at the Under-16 Grant Khomo Week in Johannesburg, starting all three matches in the inside centre position. He also started all three matches for a KwaZulu-Natal team that hosted the 2013 Under-18 Academy Week at Glenwood High School in Durban, and at the Under-18 Craven Week – South Africa's premier rugby union tournament at high school level – held in Middelburg in 2014.

2015–2018: Sharks

He was included in the  squad that participated in the 2015 Under-19 Provincial Championship, and started each of their twelve matches in the competition. He scored tries in matches against ,  and  – in both their home and away clashes – before ending the season with two tries in their final match against Free State U19. Despite Blewett's six tries (and a single conversion for a season tally of 32 points), the Sharks endured a poor season, winning just one match and finishing bottom of the log.

One try followed in a 16–44 defeat to  before another two-try haul in their 97–0 win over the UFH Blues. Blewett's total of seven tries was the second-most by any player in the competition, behind team-mate Thobekani Buthelezi, and helped UKZN Impi to second spot on the log. However, the Varsity Cup Executive Committee ruled that UKZN Impi fielded an ineligible player throughout the season and imposed a twelve points deduction, which cost UKZN Impi a place in the Varsity Shield final and a Varsity Cup promotion play-off against .

After the Varsity Shield, Blewett linked up with the  squad that participated in the 2016 Currie Cup qualification series. He spent the rest of the season playing in the 2016 Under-21 Provincial Championship for the  team, where he scored six tries in six appearances to end as the joint-top try scorer in the competition. The team finished in sixth spot to miss out on the title play-offs.

At the end of October 2016, Blewett was included in the  Super Rugby squad for the 2017 season.

2018: Southern Kings

2018–2020: New Orleans Gold

Blewett moved to the United States to join Major League Rugby side New Orleans Gold on a two-year deal. Blewett returned to South Africa in 2020.

2021: Worthing Raiders

As of 2021, Blewett was playing for National League 2 South side Worthing Rugby Football Club

References

1996 births
Living people
Expatriate rugby union players in the United States
New Orleans Gold players
Rugby union centres
Rugby union fullbacks
Rugby union players from Johannesburg
Rugby union wings
Sharks (Currie Cup) players
South African people of English descent
South African expatriate rugby union players
South African expatriate sportspeople in the United States
Southern Kings players
Eastern Province Elephants players
Alumni of Hilton College (South Africa)